The Ocean Race Europe is an offshore yacht race around Europe created and run by the organisers of The Ocean Race. Its inaugural edition is the 2021 Ocean Race Europe, which began 25 May 2021 as a three-leg course from Lorient, France to Genoa, Italy.

The Ocean Race Europe is planned to take place every four years, with a two-year interval between installments of The Ocean Race Europe and The Ocean Race. This would allow teams to take part in an Ocean Race-related competition every two years.

Background 
In 2018, the 2021 Ocean Race was taken under new ownership by The Ocean Race 1973 SLU, a successor company to Atlant Ocean Racing. This ended the twenty-year-long period of ownership of The Ocean Race by the Volvo Group and Volvo Cars, although Volvo was retained as a sponsor and premier partner. A ten-year plan confirming future editions of The Ocean Race on a four-year cycle was announced in July 2020.

After the 2021 Ocean Race was postponed to 2022-23 because of the COVID-19 pandemic, the event's owners carried out a feasibility study on a potential European race in 2021. The 2021 Ocean Race Europe was announced in October 2020, with entries opening in January 2021. Twelve teams were announced for the 2021 Ocean Race Europe; seven teams competed in Volvo Ocean 65s (VO65s), while five others competed in IMOCA 60s.

Yachts 

The 2021 Ocean Race Europe used foiling IMOCA 60s and the one-design VO65s. The two classes compete at the same time and along the same route, with separate winners and prizes in each class. All boats are fully-crewed and have female crew members on board. Both the IMOCA 60s and VO65s will contest the 2022-23 Ocean Race.

Editions

2021 Ocean Race Europe 

The 2021 Ocean Race Europe began 25 May 2021 on a three-leg course from Lorient to Genoa, with stops in Cascais, Portugal and Alicante, Spain.

A ten-day, four-leg race from Klaipėda, Lithuania to the South Swedish Waypoint was organised by four of the seven VO65 teams in the lead-up to the 2021 Ocean Race Europe. Team Childhood 1 took overall victory.

The first leg of the 2021 Ocean Race Europe, from Lorient to Cascais, commenced on 29 May 2021. It was won in the IMOCA 60 class by CORUM L'Épargne, and in the VO65 class by The Austrian Ocean Race Project.

The first of two coastal races was held in Cascais on 5 June 2021. It was won in the IMOCA 60 class by Offshore Team Germany, and in the VO65 class by Mirpuri Foundation Racing Team.

The second leg of the 2021 Ocean Rage Europe, from Cascais to Alicante, commenced on 6 June 2021. 11th Hour Racing Team were forced to return to Cascais after a collision that damaged their port foil. The team resumed racing later that same day after their damaged foil was removed.

Races

See also 
 List of Volvo Ocean Race sailors

References

External links 
 Official website

Recurring sporting events established in 2021
The Ocean Race
Yachting races